The 2015 Missouri Valley Conference men's basketball tournament, popularly referred to as "Arch Madness", was an event held March 5–8, at the Scottrade Center in St. Louis. It was part of the 2014–15 NCAA Division I men's basketball season.

Seeds
Teams were seeded by conference record, with a ties broken by record between the tied teams followed by non-conference strength of schedule, if necessary. The top six seeds received first round byes.

Schedule

Tournament bracket

Postseason History Multiple Bids 

{|width="100%"
|-----
| valign="top" |

External links
2015 MVC Mens Basketball Championship

2014–15 Missouri Valley Conference men's basketball season
Missouri Valley Conference men's basketball tournament